The Kadınlar Basketbol Ligi (English: Women's Basketball League) and known as the Commercial Insurance Basketbol Kadınlar Ligi due to sponsorship reasons is the top women's basketball league in Northern Cyprus. It is run by the Turkish Cypriot Basketball Federation.

Current teams

1 Soyer Spor Kulübü is a Lefke-based team playing their home games at the Atatürk Spor Salonu, Nicosia.

Recent champions

2008–09 – Yakın Doğu Üniversitesi
2009–10 – Yakın Doğu Üniversitesi
2010–11 – Yakın Doğu Üniversitesi
2011–12 – Yakın Doğu Üniversitesi
2012–16 – not played
2016–17 – Gönyeli 
2017–18 – ongoing

Source:

External links
 Turkish Cypriot basketball on Eurobasket
 KKTC Basketbol Federasyonu

References 

Basketball leagues in Europe
Sports competitions in Northern Cyprus
Basketball in Northern Cyprus